Dhoop Chhaon may refer to:
 Dhoop Chhaon (1935 film), a Hindi film
 Dhoop Chhaon (1977 film), a Hindi film